Prince  was the 15th and last shōgun of the Tokugawa shogunate of Japan. He was part of a movement which aimed to reform the aging shogunate, but was ultimately unsuccessful. He resigned his position as shogun in late 1867, while aiming at keeping some political influence. After these efforts failed following the defeat at the Battle of Toba–Fushimi in early 1868, he went into retirement, and largely avoided the public eye for the rest of his life.

Early life

Tokugawa Yoshinobu was born in Edo as the seventh son of Tokugawa Nariaki, daimyō of Mito. Mito was one of the gosanke, the three branch families of the Tokugawa clan which were eligible to be chosen as shōgun. His birth name was Matsudaira Shichirōmaro (松平七郎麻呂) His mother, Princess Arisugawa Yoshiko, was a member of the Arisugawa-no-miya, a cadet branch of the imperial family; through her, he was a third cousin (once removed) of the then-Emperor Ninkō. Shichirōmaro was brought up under strict, spartan supervision and tutelage. His father Nariaki followed the example of the second Mito daimyo, Tokugawa Mitsukuni (1661-1690), who had sent all his sons after the firstborn to be raised in Mito. Shichirōmaro was seven months old when he arrived in Mito in 1838. He was taught in the literary and martial arts, as well as receiving a solid education in the principles of politics and government at Kōdōkan.

At the instigation of his father, Shichirōmaro was adopted by the Hitotsubashi-Tokugawa family in order to have a better chance of succeeding to the shogunate and changed his first name to Akimune (昭致). He became family head in 1847, coming of age that year, receiving court rank and title, and taking the name Yoshinobu. Upon the death of the 13th shōgun, Iesada, in 1858, Yoshinobu was nominated as a potential successor. His supporters touted his skill and efficiency in managing family affairs. However, the opposing faction, led by Ii Naosuke, won out. Their candidate, the young Tokugawa Yoshitomi, was chosen, and became the 14th shōgun Iemochi. Soon after, during the Ansei Purge, Yoshinobu and others who supported him were placed under house arrest. Yoshinobu himself was made to retire from Hitotsubashi headship.

The period of Ii's domination of the Tokugawa government was marked by mismanagement and political infighting. The three men then took numerous steps to quell political unrest in the Kyoto area, and gathered allies to counter the activities of the rebellious Chōshū Domain. They were instrumental figures in the kōbu gattai political party, which sought a reconciliation between the shogunate and the imperial court.

In 1864, Yoshinobu, as commander of the imperial palace's defense, defeated the Chōshū forces in their attempt to capture the imperial palace's  in what is called the Kinmon Incident. This was achieved by use of the forces of the Aizu–Satsuma coalition.

Shōgun (1866–1867)

After the death of Tokugawa Iemochi in 1866, Yoshinobu was chosen to succeed him, and became the 15th shōgun. He was the only Tokugawa shōgun to spend his entire tenure outside of Edo: he never set foot in Edo Castle as shōgun.  Immediately upon Yoshinobu's ascension as shōgun, major changes were initiated. A massive government overhaul was undertaken to initiate reforms that would strengthen the Tokugawa government. In particular, assistance from the Second French Empire was organized, with the construction of the Yokosuka arsenal under Léonce Verny, and the dispatch of a French military mission to modernize the armies of the bakufu.

The national army and navy, which had already been formed under Tokugawa command, were strengthened by the assistance of the Russians, and the Tracey Mission provided by the British Royal Navy.  Equipment was also purchased from the United States. The outlook among many was that the Tokugawa Shogunate was gaining ground towards renewed strength and power; however, it fell in less than a year.

Boshin War (1868–69)

Fearing the renewed strengthening of the Tokugawa shogunate under a strong and wise ruler, samurai from Satsuma, Chōshū and Tosa formed an alliance to counter it. Under the banner of sonnō jōi ("revere the Emperor, expel the barbarians!") coupled with a fear of the new shōgun as the "Rebirth of Ieyasu" (家康の再来) who would continue to usurp the power of the Emperor, they worked to bring about an end to the shogunate, though they varied in their approaches. In particular, Tosa was more moderate; it proposed a compromise whereby Yoshinobu would resign as shōgun, but preside over a new national governing council composed of various daimyōs. To this end, Yamanouchi Toyonori, the lord of Tosa, together with his advisor, Gotō Shōjirō, petitioned Yoshinobu to resign in order to make this possible.

On November 9, 1867, Yoshinobu tendered his resignation to the Emperor and formally stepped down ten days later, returning governing power to the Emperor. He then withdrew from Kyoto to Osaka. However, Satsuma and Chōshū, while supportive of a governing council of daimyōs, were opposed to Yoshinobu leading it. They secretly obtained an imperial edict calling for the use of force against Yoshinobu (later shown to be a forgery) and moved a massive number of Satsuma and Chōshū troops into Kyoto. There was a meeting called at the imperial court, where Yoshinobu was stripped of all titles and land, despite having taken no action that could be construed as aggressive or criminal. Any who would have opposed this were not included in the meeting. Yoshinobu opposed this action, and composed a message of protest, to be delivered to the imperial court; at the urging of the leaders of Aizu, Kuwana, and other domains, and in light of the immense number of Satsuma and Chōshū troops in Kyoto, he dispatched a large body of troops to convey this message to the court.

When the Tokugawa forces arrived outside Kyoto, they were refused entry, and were attacked by Satsuma and Chōshū troops, starting the Battle of Toba–Fushimi, the first clash of the Boshin War. Though the Tokugawa forces had a distinct advantage in numbers, Yoshinobu abandoned his army in the midst of the fight once he realized the Satsuma and Chōshū forces raised the Imperial banner, and escaped to Edo. He placed himself under voluntary confinement, and indicated his submission to the imperial court. However, a peace agreement was reached wherein Tayasu Kamenosuke, the young head of a branch of the Tokugawa family, was adopted and made Tokugawa family head; On April 11, Edo Castle was handed over to the imperial army, and the city spared from all-out war.

Together with Kamenosuke (who took the name Tokugawa Iesato), Yoshinobu moved to Shizuoka. Tokugawa Ieyasu, founder of the Tokugawa Shogunate, had also retired to Shizuoka, centuries earlier. Iesato was made the daimyō of the new Shizuoka Domain, but lost this title a few years later, when the domains were abolished. Even after losing his position as ruling shogun, Yoshinobu strove to promote his son Iesato’s political career so that he could attain the highest level of influence in the Japanese Imperial court, and also serve as a bridge between old world Japan and modern emerging Japan both domestically and internationally. The close relationship between father and son is highlighted in the illustrated biography on Prince Tokugawa Iesato titled The Art of Peace. 

Many of the hatamoto also relocated to Shizuoka; a large proportion of them did not find adequate means to support themselves. As a result, many of them resented Yoshinobu, some of them to the point of wanting him dead. Yoshinobu was aware of this, and was so afraid of assassination that he redesigned his sleeping arrangement to confuse any potential assassin.

Later life 

Living a life in quiet retirement, Yoshinobu indulged in many hobbies, including oil painting, Kyudo (archery), hunting, photography, and cycling. Some of Yoshinobu's photographs have been published in recent years by his great-grandson, Yoshitomo. His other great-grandson, Yasuhisa Tokugawa of the Mito line, is the former Chief Priest at Yasukuni Shrine and current Kaicho of the Kokusai Budoin (IMAF).

In 1902, the Emperor Meiji allowed him to re-establish his own house as a Tokugawa branch (bekke) with the highest rank in the peerage, that of prince (kōshaku), for his loyal service to Japan. He took a seat in the House of Peers, and resigned in 1910. Tokugawa Yoshinobu died on 21 November 1913 at 16:10 and is buried in Yanaka Cemetery, Tokyo.

On 9 January 1896, his ninth daughter Tsuneko Tokugawa (1882–1939) married Prince Fushimi Hiroyasu, a second cousin to both Emperor Shōwa and Empress Kōjun and nephew of Prince Kan'in Kotohito.

On 26 December 1911, his granddaughter Kikuko Tokugawa was born. She married Prince Takamatsu, the brother of Emperor Shōwa, to become Princess Takamatsu.

Honors
Prince (3 June 1902)
Grand Cordon of the Order of the Rising Sun (30 April 1908)
Grand Cordon of the Order of the Rising Sun with Paulownia Flowers (22 November 1913; posthumous)

Order of precedence
Third rank (first day, 12th month of the fourth year of Koka (1847))
Second rank (10th day, 12th month of the first year of Keio (1865))
Senior second rank (fifth day, 12th month of the second year of Keio (1866); degraded 28th day, ninth month of the second year of Meiji (1869))
Fourth rank (appointed 6 January 1872, following degradation in 1869)
Senior second rank (18 May 1880, restored)
Junior first rank (20 June 1888)

Eras of Yoshinobu's bakufu
The years in which Yoshinobu was shōgun are more specifically identified by more than one era name or nengō.
 Keiō                (1865–1868)
 Meiji  (1868–1912)

Family

 Father: Tokugawa Nariaki
 Mother: Arisugawa Yoshiko (1804–1893)
 Wife: Ichijo Mikako (1835–1894)
 Concubines:
 Isshiki Suga (1839–1929)
 Shinmura Nobu (1852–1905)
 Nakane Sachi (1836–1915)
 Oyoshi
 Children:
 Kyokoin Tonoike Mizukage Gendaidōjō (1858-1858) by Mikako
 Akiko (1862-1862) by Mikako
 Sumiko (1863-1927) by Mikako
 unknown daughter by Mikako
 Genji (1871–1872) by Nobu
 Kaito (1871–1872) by Sachi
 Takuma (1873–1873) by Sachi
 Tokugawa Kyoko (1873–1893) married Tokugawa Satotaka (1856–1941) by Nobu
 Tokugawa Atsushi (1874–1930) by Sachi
 Kaneko (1875–1875) by Sachi
 Tokugawa Tetsuko (1875–1921) married Tokugawa Satotoshi by Nobu
 Hachisuka Fudeko (1876–1907) married Hachisuka Masaaki by Sachi
 Ikeda Nakahiro (1877–1948) inherited Tottori Domain by Nobu
 Hitoshi (1878–1878) by Nobu
 Yoshiko (1878–1878) by Sachi
 Ryōko (1880–1880) by Nobu
 Namiko (1880–1954) by Sachi, married Matsudaira Hitoshi, son of Matsudaira Naritami
 Kuniko (1882–1942) by Sachi, married Okouchi Kiko
 Tokugawa Tsuneko (1882–1939) by Nobu,  married Prince Fushimi Hiroyasu
 Itoko (1883–1953) by Sachi, married Shijo Ryuai
 stillborn boy (1884–1884) by Sachi
 Tokugawa Yoshihisa (1884–1922) by Nobu
 Yasushi (1885–1886) by Sachi
 Tokugawa Eiko (1887–1924) married Tokugawa Satotaka
 Tokugawa Makoto (1887–1968) by Nobu
 Katsu Kuwashi (1888–1932)  by Nobu
 Yoshiko (1891-1891 by Sachi
 Adoptive Children:
 Tokugawa Iesato (1863-1940) adopted son, who became 16th head of the Tokugawa Clan, after the end of the Shogunate dynasty. 

His grandson Tokugawa Hiromi graduated as part of the 65th Class of the Imperial Japanese Naval Academy in March 1938. On July 12, 1943, he was killed in action during World War II when his ship, the submarine , was sunk with all hands in Indispensable Strait near Guadalcanal in the Solomon Islands.

See also
 Bakumatsu
 Meiji Restoration
 Tokugawa Yoshinobu-ke

Notes

References
 Beasley, William G. (1963). The modern history of Japan. (New York: Praeger).
 Borton, Hugh (1955). Japan's Modern Century. (New York: The Ronald Press Company).
 Griffis, William Elliot. (1915). The Mikado: Institution and Person. (Princeton: Princeton University Press).
 Kobiyama Rokurō (2003). Matsudaira Katamori no shōgai. (Tokyo: Shin Jinbutsu Ōraisha).
 Murray, David (1905). Japan. (New York: G.P. Putnam's Sons).
 Sasaki Suguru (1977). Boshin sensō. (Tokyo: Chūōkōron-shinsha).
 Sims, Richard L. (1998). French Policy Towards the Bakufu and Meiji Japan, 1854–95. (London: Routledge).
 Takano Kiyoshi 高野澄 (1997). Tokugawa Yoshinobu: kindai Nihon no enshutsusha 德川慶喜 : 近代日本の演出者. (Tokyo: Nihon Hōsō Shuppan Kyōkai 日本放送出版協会).
 Tokugawa Munefusa 徳川宗英 (2004). Tokugawa Yonhyaku-nen no naisho-banashi 徳川四百年の内緒話 Vol. 1. (Tokyo: Bungei-shunju).
 Tokugawa Munefusa 徳川宗英 (2004). Tokugawa Yonhyaku-nen no naisho-banashi 徳川四百年の内緒話 Vol. 2: Raibaru tekishō hen. (Tokyo: Bungei-shunju).
 Tokugawa Yoshitomo 徳川慶朝 (2003). Tokugawa Yoshinobu-ke ni Yōkoso: Wagaya ni tsutawaru aisubeki "Saigo no Shogun" no Yokogao 徳川慶喜家にようこそ わが家に伝わる愛すべき「最後の将軍」の横顔. (Tokyo: Bungei-shunju). 
Totman, Conrad (1980). The Collapse of the Tokugawa Bakufu, 1862–1868. (Honolulu: University of Hawai'i Press)
 Treat, Payson J. (1921). Japan and the United States: 1853–1921. (New York: Houghton Mifflin Company).
 Yamakawa Kenjirō (1933). Aizu Boshin Senshi. (Tokyo: Tokyo Daigaku Shuppankai).

Further reading
 Matsuura Rei 松浦玲 (1975). Tokugawa Yoshinobu: shōgun-ke no Meiji-ishin 德川慶喜 : 将軍家の明治維新. (Tokyo: Chūōkōronsha 中央公論社).
 Satow, Ernest Mason, trans. (1905). Japan 1853–1864, Or, Genji Yume Monogatari. (Tokyo: Naigai Shuppan Kyokai).
 Shibusawa Eiichi 渋沢栄一, ed. (1967–1968) Tokugawa Yoshinobu-kō den 德川慶喜公伝. (Tokyo: Heibonsha 平凡社).

Works of fiction
 Shiba, Ryōtarō (1998). The Last Shogun: The Life of Tokugawa Yoshinobu, trans. Juliet Winters Carpenter. (New York: Kodansha International).

External links

 

1837 births
1913 deaths
19th-century shōguns
20th-century Japanese people
Tokugawa shōguns
Tokugawa clan
Tokugawa Yoshinobu family
Samurai
People of Bakumatsu
People of Meiji-period Japan
Meiji Restoration
Japanese photographers
Kazoku
Grand Cordons of the Order of the Rising Sun
People from Tokyo